Kimvula (or Kimbula) is a community in Lukaya District of Bas-Congo Province in the Democratic Republic of the Congo.
It contains the headquarters of Kimvula Territory.

References

Populated places in Kongo Central